No Place for Disgrace is the second album by American thrash metal band Flotsam and Jetsam, released in 1988. This marked the band's first album release through a major label, Elektra Records, and was also their first album with the bass guitarist Troy Gregory, who had replaced Jason Newsted when the latter left the band in 1986 to join Metallica. Despite not playing on the album, three songs on it were co-written by Newsted.

Overview
No Place for Disgrace is thematically much darker than Doomsday for the Deceiver, and while some of the band's subsequent albums have a more political edge, the lyrical content of the album was similar to its predecessor, focusing on themes centered around history and literature, as well as Satanism and the occult. No Place for Disgrace also received some notice for its cover of an Elton John song, "Saturday Night's Alright for Fighting", and upon its release charted on Billboard at 143.

According to former Flotsam and Jetsam bassist Michael Spencer, who briefly replaced Newsted, Flotsam and Jetsam's then-A&R rep Michael Alago, wanted the album to be called Blessing in Disguise. However, when Spencer left the band just prior to the recording sessions, Flotsam and Jetsam went with their own choice, and Metal Church (who was also on Elektra at the time) ended up with Blessing in Disguise as the title of their third album, which was released about nine months after No Place for Disgrace. In an April 2013 interview however, drummer Kelly David-Smith disputed Spencer's claims, saying, "No Place for Disgrace was always going to be called No Place for Disgrace. Actually, we did record a song called 'Blessing in Disguise' which was on a demo version of the album. I think about 100 copies of it were sold. I've looked on eBay and they're really hot property!"

Reception
AllMusic gave the album four stars, commenting that it "basically repeats the formula of their debut but benefits from a cleaner yet still-in-your face production job. " A staff member for About.com praised the album in a 2011 review, citing the song N.E. Terror as a highlight as it was "packed with jaw-dropping trade-off guitar solos, including a lead bass break that would make Newsted proud." Adam McCann of Metal Digest wrote: "By 1988, Flotsam and Jetsam had not only found cult fame with their stunning debut album Doomsday for the Deceiver, but they were attracting attention from the mainstream by being the band from which Metallica plucked their bass player in the shape of Jason Newsted from. Yet, unlike their debut album, No Place... was somewhat darker than its predecessor minus the well-received cover of Elton John's 'Saturday Night's Alright For Fighting', this was an album which focused very much the occult and history and it showed that there was life after Newsted."

Re-release
On February 14, 2014, the band re-released the album with Tory Edwards on violin and mandolin, stating that they had received many requests to remix the record. The band had experienced difficulties in obtaining the master tapes of the 1988 album and as such, decided to re-record the album. Of the decision, the band commented that "The aim was not really to change but to enhance it with the opportunity with the use of new tools. We have the time available as well, and it just seemed like a no-brainer."

Track listing

Credits

Band

Original release
Eric A.K. – vocals
Michael Gilbert – guitars
Edward Carlson – guitars
Troy Gregory – bass
Kelly David-Smith – drums

2014 re-release
Eric A.K. – vocals
Edward Carlson – guitars
Michael Gilbert – guitars
Mike Spencer – bass guitar
Kelly David-Smith – drums
Tory Edwards – Violin and mandolin

Production
Bill Metoyer – producer, engineering
Flotsam and Jetsam – producer
Michael Wagener – mixing at Enterprise Studios, Burbank, Los Angeles
Brian Carlstrom, Leon Johnsonn, Ken Paulakovich, Pete Magdaleno, Matt Freeman, Scott Campbell – assistant engineers
Mastered by George Marino at Sterling Sound Studios
Boris Vallejo – illustration
Dan Altwies, Kelly Smith – cover design 
Keith Rawls, Bill Calderwood – management

References

Flotsam and Jetsam (band) albums
1988 albums
Albums with cover art by Boris Vallejo
Metal Blade Records albums
Elektra Records albums